Öyle Bir Geçer Zaman ki (English: Time Goes By) is a Turkish drama television series broadcast by Kanal D based on a true story.

Plot

Season 1

The series is set in 1967 and revolves around the Akarsu family. Ali Akarsu is the patriarch of the family and he works as a seaman and the captain of a ship. He is married to Cemile and they have 4 children: Berrin (a law student at Istanbul University), Aylin and Mete, who are high school students, as well as 5-year-old son, Osman. When Ali goes on one of his many trips, he begins an affair with a Dutch woman named Caroline and that leads to the disintegration of the Akarsu family. When Caroline comes to Turkey uninvited, Cemile wounds her by stabbing and goes to jail. Caroline is hospitalized. There she sets her terms: Ali must get a divorce from Cemile in order for Caroline to drop charges against Cemile and release her from jail. Caroline moves in with Ali. Cemile and children get evicted from their house and are without money. Ali lets Cemile and children live in the unfinished house in Zeytinli, while setting obstacles for Cemile for finding a job. However Ali's mother Hasefe supports Cemile totally and helps her on daily basis.

Mete, the oldest son, sets the house on fire and Ali refuses to pay alimony to Cemile with the excuse of house restoration. Mete gets jailed for arson and beaten in jail. Ali demands the younger son, Osman, to live with him and Caroline, in order to drop the charges against Mete and set him free. Osman gets abused by Caroline, and almost drowns in the sea while Ali was procrastinating. Fortunately, Ali's acquaintance "The Fisherman" sees the child in the water and rescues Osman. Osman returns to live with his mother because of Ali's inability to take care of the boy. There, the family friendship with "The Fisherman" blossoms. He falls in love with Cemile and asks her to marry him. Ali gets crazily jealous and promises to kill him if he doesn't back off.

Meanwhile, Aylin, the middle daughter is desperate from living in poverty, agrees to marry Murat, the brother of the man that she is in love with, Soner Talaşoğlu. She also signs a prenuptial agreement, where the term is that she will become rich only after Murat's death, who is ill with an incurable disease, which makes him unable to walk and to keep his marital duties in bed. Another sister, Berrin, a university student, falls in love with Ahmet, a member of student Marxist movement, while another student, Hakan, son of a wealthy right wing man, is desperately in love with her. Ahmet's mother gets accidentally shot by the bullet which was supposed to kill Ahmet by the assassin hired by Ekram, father of Hakan. Hakan picks the gun and Ahmet starts looking for the revenge, believing that Hakan killed his mother. When truth revealed, Ahmet kills the assassin and wounds Ekram. People of Ekram start the hunting. Berrin hides Ahmet but the police find him and arrest him. Hakan helps him to flee abroad, however at a price, Berrin must marry him.

Mete falls in love with his music teacher Inci, who helped him many times, she encourages him to play guitar. He and his band take part in musical competition and become winners. They produce an album which becomes successful. Inci marries her fiancée but regrets it because her husband is not a good person. She gets seriously ill with cancer, and dies with Mete on her side. Meanwhile, Ali and Caroline get married. Caroline's old partner, a thief named Ekber, appears in Turkey and together they set up fraud to strip Ali's bank account. One thing leads to another, Ali loses everything but his pension and the house. Cemile doesn't want to marry the Fisherman because she learns the story of his life. His name is Hikmet Karci and he is a rich manufacturer, who left his wealthy lifestyle due to a family tragedy. Cemile also discovers that his ex-wife is in fragile state of mind, and she doesn't want to harm this woman, named Selma, by marrying Fisherman. Ali, still being jealous and broke, crashes the restaurant boat which Caroline sold to get revenge on him. The police are looking for Ali. A few days later he rapes Cemile.

Soon, Ali with remorse, asks Cemile to kill him. The police appear and arrest Ali for crashing the boat. Cemile suffers silently until the symptoms of pregnancy appear. Soner pays out Ali from the Jail. Ali begs Cemile to keep the baby. She has internal bleeding and gets hospitalised with all the family by her side and Ali giving her blood. There everybody learns that Cemile is pregnant and Ali is the father. Caroline is also pregnant and announces that to Ali. Ali now tells Cemile to abort the baby. Cemile aborts the baby and then she agrees to marry the Fisherman. Selma and Cemile become friends, Selma's mental condition becomes normal after spending time with little Osman. On the wedding evening, Cemile and Hikmet get married. Everybody is happy, and suddenly Ali appears and shoots Hikmet dead. He is determined to kill Cemile and then commit suicide, but his mother Hasefe, shoots him with the gun that Ahmet left at the house, crippling Ali and saving Cemile's life.

Season 2

The events of Season 2 take place two years after Season 1. The youngest son of Captain Ali and Cemile, Osman, has started primary school and has fallen in love with a girl named Gülden. However, their teacher, who also happens to be Mete's teacher in high school, always seems to be punishing little Osman because of his supposed naughtiness. Captain Ali is freed from prison after "The General Clemency". However, getting out of jail means almost nothing to him, considering his new lifestyle, poor and miserable, partly due to him raping Cemile, his ex-wife, and arguing and fighting with his children and also being robbed and tricked by Caroline.

Cemile Karcı now has legacy from Hikmet Karcı. This puts an end to her and her children's struggle with money. When her partner in ownership of Harcı Triko A.Ş marries an untrustworthy and cunning man, she decides to involve herself in the management of the company. After a rather short time, the husband, named Kenan, demonstrates his true personality causing drastic changes for the company's future. Mete Akarsu, meanwhile, becomes famous thanks to his guitar playing, songwriting, and singing. From time to time he performs with his friends in a well-known casino. Although his fame increases daily, Mete cannot forget his deceased first lover: Professor Inci, his music teacher in high school. This is underlined by him still carrying around a photograph portraying him and the beautiful Prof. Inci. Yet, instead of finally letting go of her, Mete starts to date a girl who closely resembles his first love. Though he appears to be happy at first glance, Mete soon admits to himself that he's been fooling himself and lying to his heart all the time. Unfortunately, Mete keeps suffering from the loss of Inci, until he meets another girl, Nihal, which slightly reduces his pain over his first lover's death. Aylin Akarsu keeps contact with Soner even though they are not seeing each other or talking to each other.

After a while, he returns from London and spends time hanging out with Aylin and his brother, who is now husband of Aylin. Aylin runs free and decides she can not continue being married to her wheelchair-user husband and desperately wants to marry the one man she truly loves: Soner, her husband's brother. Soner, who obviously shares the same affection for, lets her down after his younger brother commits suicide. Aylin never finds that out and gets traumatized. Berrin Akarsu, the oldest child of Captain Ali and Cemile, is married to a rich guy named Hakan and together they have a baby named Zehra. Because of "The General Clemency", Ahmet, the man who has the strongest love for Berrin has permission to enter Turkey. Kenan and Ali confront on a ship. Kenan accidentally shoots at a pipe and Ali knocks him out. Ali manages to escape the ship but Kenan dies when it explodes. All is not good for Ali though and he feels guilty about his past. He commits suicide by drowning in the sea because he knew that Cemile would never forgive him. Cemile goes hysterical when she finds this out and when she knew it was too late to save Ali, she goes to the hospital to see Aylin, (now married to Sonor) where Cemile finds out that Aylin has died in childbirth.

Season 3

A couple of years have passed from last season. Ali Akarsu committed suicide at the end of Season 2 by going out to sea, so the oldest man of the family, Mete Akarsu, begins to take more and more responsibilities. He also meets Ayça. As his music band broke up, his life gets worse, but soon he find out that Ayça loves him. Ayça is somebody whom Osman loves, also. She goes in the same high school with Osman. The key of the season is the main event, the "Military Coup" that changed the destiny of Turkey. At this time Osman, the leading character, is grown up and a high-school student. Despite trying to keep away from political fights and discussions, Osman joins a socialist group. He also has public sense and thoughts. This season Osman's life is changed because of Arif (stationer of the district). Aylin dies at childbirth, leaving Soner in grief along with their daughter. Soner is depressed and decides to leave Turkey and go to London. His best friend Süleyman, and Cemile insist on him staying in Istanbul, so Soner can take care after Deniz Yıldız Talaşoğlu.

Berrin married Ahmet and their economic situation is stable. They are living with Berrin's daughter Zehra who doesn't know that Ahmet isn't her biological father. Hakan is discharged from prison after he was accused of shooting his father. He is depressed and feels lonely and he starts to sneak peeks at his daughter. Ekram, Hakan's father, kidnaps Zehra after school and he tells her the bitter truth. Zehra is shocked to learn that Hakan is her biological father and she gets mad at Berrin for not telling her and decides to live with her biological father. Hakan is thrilled and is no longer lonesome. Soon however, Zehra is diagnosed with kidney failure. The doctor tells to her family that she needs dialysis every single day until the kidney transplant is performed. Ekram takes Zehra to his house and decides to keep her there until she recovers despite the disapproval of her mother. So Hakan decides to go live with his father and Caroline, the wife of Ekram and Captain Ali's ex-mistress. Then Caroline gets tested to see, if she could donate for Zehra and the result is positive. However, she promises to give her kidney if Hakan marries her because of how wealthy he is. At first Hakan doesn't like this but then wants to show what Caroline is actually like. Hakan starts convincing Caroline and starts to go on dates with her. After finally getting plans to get married, Hakan tells Caroline to come to a hotel in Izmir, but also inviting someone else: his father, Ekram. Ekram sees this and gets very sick. Finally, Bahar (babysitter of Deniz) becomes donor for Zehra, enraging Caroline.

Meanwhile, Arif's enemy, Tugrul comes to the show. He is said to be the brother of whom Arif killed back in his socialist days. He gets revenge by killing Arif's daughter and kidnapping Mete and Arif himself. He takes them to an abandoned mansion where many prisoners are beat to death. Tugrul uses this opportunity to try to get Cemile to be his wife and tell her that Arif is supposedly dead. Cemile agrees with this, not knowing the truth, but she first makes a deal, give Mete back to her. Tugrul agrees but still tortures Mete. Soon Turgul is killed. Ekram orders to have Ahmet assassinated which happens successfully. Berrin was pregnant from him. Mete and Ayça start dating again. Hakan and Berrin start dating again, Berrin gives birth to her second child who is a boy. Sonor marries Bahar in the last scene. They are waiting for their child to be born. After many years Osman wrote story about his family and TV started shooting of TV series.

Cast

International broadcasters

International popularity 
Öyle Bir Geçer Zamanki ki has been dubbed in more than 30 languages. According to Nielsen Media Research, Öyle Bir Geçer Zaman ki was the most popular TV show on Macedonian TV in 2013 in terms of viewers, followed by another Turkish show, Asi which came in second. In fact, Öyle Bir Geçer Zaman ki and other Turkish shows are so successful in Macedonia, that the government passed a bill to restrict broadcasts of Turkish series during the day and at prime time, in order to reduce the Turkish impact on Macedonian society.

Time Goes By was the most watched foreign TV series in Serbia during 2013. It was also dubbed in Spanish as Tormenta de Pasiones: Cuando el Amor se Convierte en un Infierno and broadcast in Chile, Puerto Rico and in the United States.

References

External links
Kanal D series
Site in spanish

2010 Turkish television series debuts
Adventure television series
Comedy-drama television series
Television series by D Productions
Historical television series
2010s romance television series
Turkish drama television series
Television series about dysfunctional families
Television series set in 1967
Television series set in 1969
Television series set in 1971
2013 Turkish television series endings
Kanal D original programming
Television shows set in Istanbul
Television series produced in Istanbul